Mariano Contreras (July 12, 1910 – December 12, 1978), better known by his stage name Pugo, was a Filipino actor, comedian, vaudevillian, and film director, famous as one half of the comedy team Pugo and Tugo during the 1930s up to 1950s. He has sometimes been credited as Mang Nano and was known as the original King of Philippine Comedy.

As an actor, Contreras has performed in movies such as Nukso ng Nukso, released in 1960, 2 Sundalong Kanin (1952), and Kambal Tuko (1952), in which he portrayed Momoy. Pugo was also a film director and has worked on Kababalaghan o Kabulastugan?, released in 1960.

After Tugo's death in 1952, Contreras teamed up with Bentot in movies, radio and television.  His popular TV shows were Tangtarangtang, Si Tatang Kasi and Wanted Boarders.

Death
Pugo died on December 12, 1978 in Manila, Philippines at the age of 68 years old.

Legacy
Pugo & his fellow on screen comedian partner Togo were both posthumously featured on the YouTube channel Graveyard Pinoy TV, a Filipino inspired version of Graveyard Hollywood TV of California was launched in 2020.

Filmography

Dash a Lotsa Nonsents! Tang Tarang Tang II (1978)
Kaming Matatapang ang Apog (1976) as Prof. Bokalini 
Yolindina (1975)
Son of Fung Ku (1975)
O...Anong Sarap! (Isa Pa Nga) (1975)
Drakula Goes to R.P. (1973)
Blood Compact (1972)
Si Inday sa Balitaw (1970)
Pitong James Bonds (1966)
Miting de Avance (1963)
Pitong Pasiklab sa Pulitika (1963)
Ang Tatay Kong Kalbo (1963)
Pitong Pasiklab sa Bahay Na Tisa (1963)
Pitong Pasiklab sa PC (1962)
Anting-Anting Daw (1962)
Tang-Tarang-Tang (1962)
Pitong Pasiklab (1962) as Asintado 
Puro Labis Puro Kulang (1962) 
Lalaban Kami (1961) 
Baby Damulag (1961) 
Triplets (1961) 
Oh Sendang (1961) 
Prinsipe Diomedes at ang Mahiwagang Gitara (1961) 
Tres Mosqueteros (1960)
Nukso nang Nukso (1960)
Yantok Mindoro (1960)
Manananggal vs. Mangkukulam (1960)
Puro Utos, Puro Utos (1959) 
Combo Festival (1958) 
Casa Grande (1958) 
Hiwaga ng Pag-Ibig (1958) 
Mr. Kuripot (1958) 
Tuloy ang Ligaya [Happiness Must Go On] (1958) 
Sebya, Mahal Kita (1957) 
Si Meyor Naman (1957) 
Golpe de Gulat (1954) 

Ganyan Lang ang Buhay (1953) 
Tumbalik na Daigdig (1953)
Kambal Tuko (1952) as Momoy 
2 Sundalong Kanin (1952) 
Dalawang Prinsipeng Kambal (1951) 
Pulo ng Engkantada (1951) 
Doctor X (1950) 
Edong Mapangarap (1950) 
Nagsaulian ng Kandila (1950) 
Bulakenyo (1949) 
Ang Kandidato (1949) 
Biglang Yaman (1949) as Mariano 
Tambol Mayor (1949)
Sorry Na Lang (1947)
Multo ni Yamashita (1947)
Noong Bata Pa si Sabel [When Sabel Was Young] (1947)
Ang Estudyante (1947)
Daily Doble (1947)
Tomadachi "Zona" (1946)
Awit ni Palaris (1946) 
Barong-Barong (1946) 
Death March (1946) 
Hanggang Pier (1946) 
Ikaw Na! (1946) 
Binibini ng Palengke (1941) 
Binibiro Lamang Kita (1941) 
Serenata sa Nayon (1941) 
Alitaptap (1940) 
Cadena de Amor (1940) 
Dugo ng Alipin (1940) 
Lihim ng Lumang Simbahan (1940) 
Patawad (1940) 
Azucena (1939) 
Kuwintas Na Ginto (1939)
Ako'y Maghihintay (1938)
Arimunding-Munding (1938)

References

External links

1910 births
1978 deaths
20th-century comedians
20th-century Filipino male actors
Burials at the Manila Memorial Park – Sucat
Filipino male comedians
Filipino male film actors
Filipino male silent film actors
Filipino male stage actors
Silent film comedians
Vaudeville performers